The University System of New Hampshire is governed by a 29-member Board of Trustees comprising the Governor of the state, the President of the Senate, the Speaker of the House, ten members appointed by the Governor and Executive Council, seven alumni-elected members, two student-elected members, the Commissioner of Education, the Commissioner of Agriculture, the presidents of the University System's four colleges and universities, and the Chancellor.

Members

As of April, 2012, the members of the Board of Trustees of the University System of New Hampshire.

Officers for 2011-2012
Dr. Edward R. MacKay—Chancellor
Edward C. Dupont—Chair
Richard E. Galway—Vice Chair
Elizabeth K. Hoadley—Secretary
William F.J. Ardinger—Liaison to the General Counsel (2008-2015)

Ex officio members
John H. Lynch—Governor of New Hampshire (2005- )
Dr. Edward R. MacKay—Chancellor (2009- )
Mark Huddleston—President, University of New Hampshire (2007- )
Todd J. Leach—President, Granite State College (2010- )
Helen F. Giles-Gee—President, Keene State College (2005- )
Dr. Sara Jayne Steen—President, Plymouth State University (2006- )
Virginia H. Barry—Commissioner of Education (2009-2013)
Lorraine S. Merrill—Commissioner of Agriculture, Markets, and Food (2007-2012)

Alumni-elected members
Elizabeth K. Hoadley—UNH (2006-2014, 2nd term)
Judith E. Blake—UNH (2008-2012, 1st term)
Frederick C. Dey—UNH (2011-2015, 1st term)
Timothy M. Riley—UNH (2009-2013, 1st term)
Robert A. Baines—KSC (2011-2015, 1st term)
Wallace R. Stevens—PSU (2011-2015, 1st term)

Student Trustees
Kurt D. Eddins—Student Trustee (UNH) (2010-2012)

Gubernatorial Appointees
Edward C. Dupont (2003-2013)
Richard E. Galway (2009-2013)
William F.J. Ardinger (2008-2015)
John D. Crosier, Sr. (1998-2014)
Pamela Diamantis (2008-2012)
George Epstein (2002-2014)
Chester E. Homer III (2008-2012)
Kenneth C. Moulton (2012-2015)
Carol S. Perkins (2008-2013)
John W. Small (2010-2015)
Henry B. Stebbins (2006-2012)

References

University System of New Hampshire